Alfred Baur (1865–1951) was born in Andelfingen, Switzerland, (Zurich). He attended school in Winterthur and joined a large international trading company which posted him in Colombo, Ceylon. When Baur came back to Switzerland in 1906, he settled in Geneva. During his travels Alfred Baur developed a passion for Oriental art. Interest in Oriental art had grown increasingly since the end of the previous century, stimulated as it was by scientific research, archeological excavation and the writings of a number of European experts.

Fondation Baur
Alfred Baur brought together a collection of Chinese porcelain, jade and Japanese art objects which stands out as one of the most beautiful private collections in Europe today. A private collection reflects the preferences of an amateur and, as such, reveals the spirit of his time. Baur chose to buy "small quantities of rare works of art rather than large numbers of articles of inferior quality". Through his collections, he appears as a man of taste. During his lifetime, he donated his collections to a foundation which bears his name and that of his wife, a Genevese by birth: the "Fondation Alfred et Eugénie Baur-Duret".

The director of the museum is Monique Crick. The curator is Helen Loveday.

See also
 Shoami
 Umetada
 Toreutics

References

External links
 Fondation Baur - a museum of Far Eastern art collected by Baur in Geneva, Switzerland 
 The Baur Collection Geneva - a rare and complete set of the BAUR COLLECTIONS in Chinese Arts Geneva, Switzerland 

1865 births
1951 deaths
Swiss art collectors
Collectors of Asian art